The Last Turning (French: Le Dernier tournant) is a 1939 French drama film directed by Pierre Chenal, written by Charles Spaak and Henri Torrès, based on the 1934 novel The Postman Always Rings Twice by James M. Cain.

Cast
Fernand Gravey as Frank
Michel Simon as Nick Marino
Corinne Luchaire as Cora Marino
Marcel Vallée as Le juge
Robert Le Vigan as Le cousin maître-chanteur
Etienne Decroux as Le patron du bistrot
Florence Marly as Madge, la dompteuse

External links

Le Dernier tournant at filmsdefrance.com

1939 films
Adultery in films
Films based on works by James M. Cain
Films directed by Pierre Chenal
Films based on crime novels
Films based on American novels
French black-and-white films
French drama films
1939 drama films
1930s French films
1930s French-language films